Veikko Johannes Kosonen (24 November 1900, Kerimäki – 11 June 1971) was a Finnish politician. He was a Member of the Parliament of Finland from May to July 1948, representing the Finnish People's Democratic League (SKDL).

References

1900 births
1971 deaths
People from Kerimäki
People from Mikkeli Province (Grand Duchy of Finland)
Finnish People's Democratic League politicians
Members of the Parliament of Finland (1945–48)